Ronald James Blake, GBS, OBE, JP (born 2 April 1934) is a civil engineer, and a former Secretary for Works in the government of colonial Hong Kong. He was appointed to the post of acting CEO of Kowloon-Canton Railway Corporation (KCRC) on 16 March 2006 to replace the outgoing Samuel Lai.

Early life
James Blake was born in the UK in 1934. He studied structural engineering part-time whilst working as a draftsman for an engineering firm after leaving school.

Career
While serving with the Royal Engineers in Her Majesty's Armed Forces he arrived in the Territory for the first time in 1958. He qualified as a Chartered Engineer two years later. He settled in Hong Kong in 1965 and worked in various private companies, participating in the construction of the Cross-Harbour Tunnel as well as the MTR amongst other projects. Prior to coming to the Territory, he had worked for Boulton and Paul in the UK. He had also worked for Scott Wilson Kirkpatrick & Partners in Hong Kong, before being appointed as Secretary for Works.

Secretary for Works
He was appointed Secretary for Works by the Hong Kong Government in 1991, a post he held until 1995. He later joined the KCRC as its Senior Director of capital projects.

Professional achievements
 Awarded gold medal by the Institute of Civil Engineers in 1997
 President of the Hong Kong Institution of Engineers from 1991-1992

References

1934 births
Living people
British civil engineers
Kowloon-Canton Railway Corporation
Government officials of Hong Kong
British emigrants to Hong Kong
Officers of the Order of the British Empire
Hong Kong civil engineers
Royal Engineers officers
Recipients of the Gold Bauhinia Star